Villa Carmen may refer to:
 Villa Carmen, Panama
 Villa del Carmen, Durazno Department, Uruguay
 Villa del Carmen, Formosa, Argentina
 Villa del Carmen, San Luis, Argentina